Wang Tiwu (29 August 1913 - 11 March 1996, born in Dongyang, Zhejiang, China) is the founder of the United Daily News and was a member of the Chinese Kuomintang Central Standing Committee.

Wang's family was from Zhejiang. In 1947, Wang was a colonel in the army of Chiang Kai-shek, traveled to Taiwan, and founded the newspaper United Daily News. His daughter, Wang Shaw-lan, owns and runs the paper.

References

1913 births
1996 deaths
20th-century Taiwanese businesspeople
Politicians from Jinhua
Kuomintang politicians in Taiwan
Republic of China politicians from Zhejiang
Taiwanese humanitarians
Businesspeople from Zhejiang
Taiwanese people from Zhejiang
People from Dongyang
Taiwanese newspaper founders